Karine Claireaux (born 15 November 1963) was a member of the Senate of France.  She was first elected in 2011, and represented Saint Pierre and Miquelon.  A customs officer by profession, she was a member of the Socialist Party, before joining the La République En Marche group in 2017. She has been the mayor of Sainte-Pierre, Saint Pierre and Miquelon since 2001.

References

Page on the French Senate website

1963 births
Living people
French Senators of the Fifth Republic
Saint Pierre and Miquelon politicians
La République En Marche! politicians
Women members of the Senate (France)
Senators of Saint Pierre and Miquelon
21st-century French women